Barbara Roe Hicklin (December 8, 1918 – December 24, 2010) was a Canadian painter who, in 1975, became the first woman president of the Alberta Society of Artists.

Biography
Barbara Roe Hicklin (née Barbara Jane Roe) was born in Toronto, Ontario on December 8, 1918. The Roe family moved to Jasper, Alberta in the early 1920s and then, after the death of her father, they moved back to Ontario.

Hicklin studied art in the 1930s at the Central Technical School and the Ontario College of Art and Design, both located in Toronto. In the early 1940s Hicklin moved to New York where she studied at the New York Phoenix School of Design and she graduated in 1946. While attending school she worked as a commercial artist.

From 1951 to 1956 Hicklin worked as a theatre set designer in Sarnia, Ontario. She married Hugh Hicklin sometime after World War II.

In the late 1950s Hicklin relocated again, this time to Edmonton, Alberta. There she took up water colour painting and joined the Alberta Society of Artists and the Edmonton Art Club.

In the mid-1970s Hicklin outfitted a vehicle (the "Van Go") to tour the Canadian countryside in order to create watercolour landscapes. In 1980 she became a member of Canadian Society of Painters in Water Colour.

Hicklin continued her peripatetic life, crossing the country, and making several trips to the Yukon.

She died on December 24, 2010.

Exhibitions
One woman shows
 Centennial Library Art Gallery, Edmonton; 1970
 Canadian Art Galleries, Calgary; 1971
 Canadian Art Galleries, Edmonton; 1973
 University of Calgary, Calgary; 1976
 Canadian Art Galleries, Calgary; 1977
 Nichols Arts Museum, Calgary; 1979
 
Select group exhibitions
 Alberta '73, the Edmonton Art Gallery, Edmonton; 1973
 Prairie '74, the Edmonton Art Gallery, Edmonton; 1974
 Canadian Society of Painters in Watercolor, The Glenbow-Alberta Institute, Calgary; 1976

References

 Barbara Roe Hicklin images on MutualArt

1918 births
2010 deaths
20th-century Canadian women artists
20th-century Canadian painters
Canadian women painters
Artists from Toronto